Huntingdonshire District Council in Cambridgeshire, England holds elections for all its councillors together every fourth year. Prior to changing to all-out elections in 2018, one third of the council was elected each year, followed by one year without an election. Since the last boundary changes in 2017, 52 councillors have been elected from 26 wards.

Political control
Since the first election to the council in 1973 political control of the council has been held by the following parties:

Leadership
The leaders of the council since 2001 have been:

Council elections
Summary of the council composition after recent council elections, click on the year for full details of each election. Boundary changes took place for the 2004 election reducing the number of seats by 1, leading to the whole council being elected in that year.

District result maps

By-election results
By-elections occur when seats become vacant between council elections. Below is a summary of recent by-elections; full by-election results can be found by clicking on the by-election name.

References

External links
Huntingdonshire District Council

 
Council elections in Cambridgeshire
District council elections in England